It Was the Best of Times is the third live album by the English rock band Supertramp, released in April 1999. The album title makes use of the opening line from A Tale of Two Cities by Charles Dickens.

Overview 
It Was the Best of Times was recorded in September 1997 at the Royal Albert Hall, London, England, UK during the "It's About Time" tour (set up in support of the Some Things Never Change studio album).

The band includes vocalist/guitarist/keyboardist Mark Hart performing songs originally sung by Roger Hodgson.

Supertramp are also augmented by additional players added for this album and tour which later would also take part in the recording of Slow Motion, the follow-up studio album released in 2002.

The 2-CD version features the song "Don't You Lie to Me", a blues song that the band had performed on their 1988 tour and the only song not written by a current or former band member.

The single CD version was later re-released in 2006 under the name of Live, 1997.

Reception

Reviewing the double CD edition, AllMusic wrote that in comparison to the single CD version, "...this two-CD set packs on eight further selections from Supertramp's career to that point, still eschewing their first two LPs, without really adding anything to the portrait painted by the slimmer edition."

Track listing
All songs written by Rick Davies and Roger Hodgson, except where noted.

2-CD version

Disc 1
 "It's a Hard World" (Rick Davies)
 "You Win, I Lose" (Davies)
 "Listen to Me Please" (Davies)
 "Ain't Nobody But Me"
 "Sooner or Later" (Davies, Mark Hart)
 "Free as a Bird" (Davies)
 "Cannonball" (Davies)
 "From Now On"
 "Breakfast in America"
 "Give Me a Chance" (Davies, Hart)
 "Rudy"

Disc 2
 "Downstream"
 "Another Man's Woman"
 "Take the Long Way Home"
 "Bloody Well Right"
 "The Logical Song"
 "Goodbye Stranger"
 "School"
 "And the Light" (Davies)
 "Don't You Lie to Me (I Get Evil)" (Tampa Red)
 "Crime of the Century"

1-CD version: Live, 1997
 "You Win, I Lose" – 4:44 (Davies)
 "Listen to Me Please" – 5:03 (Davies)
 "Sooner or Later" – 7:35 (Davies, Hart)
 "Free as a Bird" – 4:49 (Davies)
 "Cannonball" – 7:52 (Davies)
 "From Now On" – 7:44
 "Breakfast in America" – 2:47
 "And the Light" – 5:03 (Davies)
 "Take the Long Way Home" – 5:10
 "Bloody Well Right" – 6:58
 "The Logical Song" – 4:04
 "Goodbye Stranger" – 7:24
 "School" – 6:32

Personnel
 Rick Davies – vocals, keyboards, harmonica
 Mark Hart – vocals, keyboards, lead and acoustic guitars
 Carl Verheyen – rhythm guitars,   backing vocals 
 Cliff Hugo – bass guitar,  backing  vocals 
 John Helliwell – saxophone,  keyboards,  backing  vocals 
 Lee Thornburg – trumpet
 Bob Siebenberg – drums, percussion
 Jesse Siebenberg – percussion

Charts and certifications

Weekly charts

Certifications

References

1999 live albums
Supertramp live albums
Live albums recorded at the Royal Albert Hall
EMI Records albums